Benjamin Michael Flowers (born  1987) is an American lawyer from Ohio who has served as the Solicitor General of Ohio since 2019.

Education 

Flowers earned his Bachelor of Arts, summa cum laude, from Ohio State University in 2009 and his Juris Doctor with high honors, from The University of Chicago Law School in 2012.

Career
Flowers served as a law clerk to Judge Sandra Ikuta of the United States Court of Appeals for the Ninth Circuit and in 2015 he clerked for Associate Justice Antonin Scalia of the Supreme Court of the United States. Prior to his appointment as Solicitor General he  served as an appellate litigator at Jones Day where his practice focused on appeals and complex trial-level motions. He litigated cases involving numerous subject areas—ranging from bankruptcy law to constitutional law—in courts across the country, including the Supreme Court of the United States and the Supreme Court of Ohio.

On January 2, 2019, Attorney General–elect Yost announced the appointed of Flowers as Solicitor General. In that role, Flowers has argued numerous cases, including:

 Shoop v. Twyford, 596 U.S. __ (U.S. 2022)
 NFIB v. Department of Labor, No. 21A244, 21A247 (U.S. 2022)
 Hill v. Shoop, 11 F.4th 373 (6th Cir. 2021) (en banc)
 Preterm-Cleveland v. McCloud, 994 F.3d 512 (6th Cir. 2021) (en banc) 
 Youngstown City School Dist. Bd. of Edn. v. State, 161 Ohio St.3d 24, 2020-Ohio-2903 (Ohio 2020)

In 2022, Flowers argued before the Supreme Court that vaccination and testing requirements introduced during the COVID-19 pandemic by the Joe Biden administration should be struck down. Flowers tested positive for COVID-19 when he was supposed to argue before the Supreme Court, leading him to argue remotely.

Flowers was an adjunct professor at The Ohio State University Moritz College of Law, where he co-taught appellate advocacy. He is a member of the Federalist Society.

Personal life 
Flowers is married to Denise Vendeland Flowers.

See also 
 List of law clerks of the Supreme Court of the United States (Seat 9)

References

External links 
 Appearances at the U.S. Supreme Court from the Oyez Project

1980s births
Living people
Date of birth missing (living people)
Place of birth missing (living people)
20th-century American lawyers
21st-century American lawyers
Federalist Society members
Law clerks of the Supreme Court of the United States
Ohio lawyers
Ohio Republicans
Ohio State University alumni
Ohio State University faculty
Solicitors General of Ohio
University of Chicago Law School alumni